Peter Andrew Georgescu (born March 9, 1939 in Bucharest) is a Romanian-American business executive, author, and the Chairman Emeritus of Young & Rubicam.

Early life and education
Peter's father, Valeriu C. Georgescu was the manager of the Romanian Ploesti Oil fields under Standard Oil of New Jersey, Due to this position Valeriu had been asked to spy for the Soviet Union and then asked by the FBI to turn double agent.

Georgescu has claimed that, at one point he, his elder brother, Constantin and grandfather were jailed by the new Soviet satellite regime. Concurrently his father, then away on business in New York City, decided to stay in the United States. In 1954 Peter was allowed to leave Romania after his father, having gone to the press at the advice of the U.S. Government, obtained the intervention of Congresswoman Frances Payne Bolton of Ohio and President Dwight Eisenhower. Peter later claimed he was traded along with his brother for unnamed Soviet spies.  Also in 1954, shortly following the boys' release and safe arrival in the United States, they appeared on the Today Show with Dave Garroway in an interview.

Peter Georgescu went on to attend Phillips Exeter Academy at the invitation of the headmaster and subsequently to earn his BA degree from Princeton University and his MBA from Stanford.

Business career and writing
Georgescu became chairman and CEO of Young & Rubicam in 1994 and served in those positions until 2000. As chairman he began to streamline the company's operations. In 1995 Y&R began an acquisition push increasing ownership in advertising agencies and public relations firms across Africa, Asia, Europe, and Latin America.

Georgescu is the author of the books The Constant Choice: An Everyday Journey From Evil Towards Good and The Source of Success and he wrote the foreword for "Eisenhower on Leadership: Ike's Enduring Lessons in Total Victory Management". He was interviewed on The Constant Choice by Leonard Lopate on the Leonard Lopate Show on WNYC, the NPR affiliate in New York City. He was elected to the American Advertising Federation Hall of Fame in 2011.

An opinion piece Georgescu penned in the Sunday Review section of The New York Times, on financial disparity, titled, "Capitalists, Arise: We Need to Deal with Income Inequality", in which he argues that monetary disparity in the U.S. has to be addressed as the situation otherwise would lead to unbearable taxes or social tempest, engendered over one thousand comments on the newspaper's Facebook page.

Georgescu has sat on the Board of Trustees of NewYork–Presbyterian Hospital since 1996.

Georgescu received the Golden Plate Award of the American Academy of Achievement in 1997. 

Georgescu endorsed Democratic candidate Hillary Clinton in the 2016 U.S. presidential election.

References

External links
Official website

1939 births
Living people
American advertising executives
Romanian emigrants to the United States
20th-century American businesspeople
21st-century American businesspeople
Businesspeople from Bucharest